Tlacacuitlahuatzin was the first ruler of Tiliuhcan, a pre-Columbian Tepanec altepetl (ethnic state) near Tlacopan.

Family
His father was called Huehuetzin.

His daughters Miyahuaxochtzin and Matlalxochtzin married Huitzilihuitl and Tlatolqaca (respectively), sons of Acamapichtli, the first king of Tenochtitlan. Another daughter, Tlacochcuetzin, married Aculnahuacatl Tzaqualcatl, the first king of Tlacopan.

Upon his death, Tlacacuitlahuatzin was succeeded by Tzihuactlayahuallohuatzin, a son of Tezozomoc, the ruler of Azcapotzalco.

Tlacacuitlahuatzin was a grandfather of the prince Huehue Zaca.

Notes

References
 
 
 

Tlatoque
Year of birth unknown
Year of death unknown